The Napa Valley Championship was a golf tournament on the Champions Tour from 1989 to 2002. It was played in Napa, California at the Silverado Country Club.

The purse for the 2002 tournament was US$1,300,000, with $195,000 going to the winner. The tournament was founded in 1989 as the Transamerica Senior Golf Championship.

Winners
Napa Valley Championship presented by Beringer Vineyards
2002 Tom Kite

The Transamerica
2001 Sammy Rachels
2000 Jim Thorpe
1999 Bruce Fleisher
1998 Jim Colbert
1997 Dave Eichelberger
1996 John Bland
1995 Lee Trevino
1994 Kermit Zarley
1993 Dave Stockton

Transamerica Senior Golf Championship
1992 Bob Charles
1991 Charles Coody
1990 Lee Trevino
1989 Billy Casper

Source:

References

Former PGA Tour Champions events
Golf in California
Sports in the San Francisco Bay Area
Napa, California
1989 establishments in California
2002 disestablishments in California
Recurring sporting events established in 1989
Recurring sporting events disestablished in 2002